"Give It Up" is a song by English singer Nathan Sykes, featuring vocals from American rapper G-Eazy. The song was released in the United Kingdom on 29 April 2016 as the third single from his debut studio album Unfinished Business (2016). The song peaked at number 56 on the UK Singles Chart.

Music video
A music video to accompany the release of "Give It Up" was first released onto YouTube on 27 April 2016.

Track listing

Chart performance

Weekly charts

Release history

References

2016 singles
2015 songs
Nathan Sykes songs
Songs written by Nathan Sykes
Songs written by Harmony Samuels
Songs written by Carmen Reece
Songs written by Teddy Riley
Songs written by Talay Riley
Songs written by G-Eazy
Songs written by Matthew Burnett